Hagerstown Airport  is a public airport located one mile (1.6 km) south of the central business district of Hagerstown, a town in Wayne County, Indiana, United States. This airport is publicly owned by the Town of Hagerstown.

Facilities 
 Runway 2/20: 4,000 x 200 ft (1,219 x 61 m), Surface: Turf

References

External links 
 Airplane Museums in Indiana

Airports in Indiana
Transportation buildings and structures in Wayne County, Indiana